Rabbids, also known as Raving Rabbids (French: Lapins Crétins), is a multimedia franchise developed and published by Ubisoft. It originated as a spin-off video game from the Rayman video game series, 2006's Rayman Raving Rabbids. Rabbids is centered on a titular fictional species of mischievous rabbit-like creatures, who speak gibberish and scream wildly whenever they experience an adrenaline rush. Most video games from the franchise are of the party video game genre, though other genres have been explored as well.

The Rabbids were initially introduced as antagonists in the Rayman series of games. The popularity of the characters, aided by various viral videos and media appearances, led Raving Rabbids to become its own separate franchise, dropping the Rayman name as of 2009's Rabbids Go Home. The success of the Rabbid characters led the developers to create more games in the franchise, eventually leading to the removal of the Rayman character from the franchise entirely. 

The Rabbids have gone on to appear in other expanded media, such as a TV show and a feature film in development, as well as making guest appearances in other Ubisoft games. As of June 2019, the series had sold over 20 million units worldwide. A film adaptation is in development by Lionsgate, Ubisoft Film & Television, Mandeville Films, & Stoopid Buddy Stoodios.

Development
The earliest Rayman 4 trailers depicted menacing rabbits, appearing from underground with a blank stare in various shapes and forms, smaller eyes and furry. At this point, trailers showed the game as an adventure game with fight stages, where Rayman would need to punch and kick himself through a horde of zombie-like bunnies. As the game concept evolved, from one of a central objective to minigames, a series of viral videos were created by marketing manager Adrian Lacey and animator Charles Beirnaert which became successful on YouTube. The rabbits slowly evolved into various merchandising products such as the Rabbid figures, which were much more conscious and amusing, changing from merely being enemies to fight through into more characters with various traits and quirks. Rayman creator Michel Ancel described the bunnies as "vicious, but at the same time [...] totally stupid". 

In a video interview, project lead Loïc Gounon confirmed the possibility of splitting the Rayman and Rabbid series apart, mentioning that the Rabbids "managed to hit a bit more adult and a bit more older audience than the previous Raymans". By 2009's Rabbids Go Home, Rayman does not make an appearance; when asked about the omission of Rayman during an interview about Rabbids Go Home, director Jacques Exertier provided an assurance that Rayman would return for more action-adventure video games.

The music style for the franchise was created by composer Mark Griskey. Griskey worked with audio director Yoan Fanise to define the comedic style of the early games and the style was continued with the further versions of the franchise.

Characters

Rabbids – Rabbids are wild rabbit-like creatures. They like to cause havoc and mischief on Rayman's world, the human world, and others and are gibberish speaking and yell "bwah!" whenever they experience adrenaline rushes. They were originally the antagonists; however, due to increase in popularity, they became the protagonists in Rabbids Go Home. A notable Rabbid who first appeared in Mario + Rabbids Kingdom Battle is Rabbid Peach.

Rayman – the main protagonist of the first three games. He always foils the Rabbids' plans. When the Rabbids became the protagonists of the franchise, Rayman was dropped, but continues to appear in his own games. He will appear as a playable character in a Mario + Rabbids: Sparks of Hope downloadable content.

Professor Barranco III – the third leader of the Rabbids who planned out all of their invasions on Rayman's world, Earth and others. He is seen in the games Rayman Raving Rabbids 2, Rabbids: Travel in Time and Rabbids: Alive and Kicking as the main antagonist. He is one of the rare smart Rabbids to exist after the events of Rabbids Go Home, but can be easily fooled as well. In Rabbids: Alive and Kicking he has a Rabbid scientist as his second in command, who would later go on to become a major character in the TV series. He is heterochromic, with blue and red eyes. He appears in the TV series, but is more of a dictator to his rabbid minions.

Serguei – Serguei is the main villain of Rayman Raving Rabbids. He is a large, black rabbid who abducted Rayman and the Globox kids and forced them to take part in the Rabbids Olympics filled with deadly challenges. In the end, Rayman manages to escape and free most of the Globox kids. It is unknown what happens to Serguei at that point, though his absence in further games suggest that he was relieved of his duties due to failure in keeping Rayman.

The Semi-Leaders – the Semi-leaders are fat, lazy and angry Rabbids who serve as the secondary antagonists of Rayman Raving Rabbids 2. They constantly force the Rabbids to bring them food and do not do pretty much anything other than sitting or lying around and keeping things in check. They each have different themes in clothing.

Professor Barranco II-  Professor Barranco II is the Supreme leader of all Rabbids. He is seen wearing Black glasses and Surgical equipment and he is responsible for everything in Rayman Raving Rabbids 1. In promotional videos he can be seen designing contraptions that would appear in Rayman Raving Rabbids. He alongside 3 other leaders is the smartest Rabbid to exist outside of the 2010 TV series.

Games

In other media

Other video games 
The Rabbids have made several appearances in games outside of their own series or the Rayman franchise. In Red Steel, the Rabbids appear as enemies in one of the game's later stages. The Wii version of Teenage Mutant Ninja Turtles: Smash-Up includes three different types of Rabbids as playable characters, along with a stage based on Rabbids Go Home. Toys of the Rabbids appear as hidden easter eggs in Tom Clancy's Splinter Cell: Conviction and Watch Dogs. In Assassin's Creed IV: Black Flag, a cheat can be used to turn the game's enemies into Rabbids. The song "Here Comes the Hotstepper" in Just Dance 2 and Just Dance: Summer Party includes a Rabbid who attempts to dance with the choreographer. Another song, "Make the Party (Don't Stop)" in Just Dance 4, features a Rabbid as the DJ in the background. Also, the alternate version of the song "Naughty Girl" in the Nintendo Switch version of Just Dance 2018 via the Just Dance Unlimited subscription service includes Rabbid Peach from Mario + Rabbids Kingdom Battle as the main choreographer. Super Smash Bros. Ultimate features three Rabbids from Mario + Rabbids Kingdom Battle as unlockable spirits and a Rabbid Mii Fighter hat was available as downloadable content on January 28, 2020. On April Fools' Day 2019, For Honor featured a limited time event in which Rabbids replaced all of the game's characters. In 2021, they have been featured in The Crew 2 as their own Live Summit Event, as well as introducing two vanity cosmetic items into the game. The first is roofrack of a Rabbid hanging on to it and the second being a window tint full of Rabbids which can only be acquired by scoring platinum in the Live Summit. They also appeared in a Stumble Guys crossover event, which introduced six unlockable characters and a new “Rabbids Rampage” show.

TV series 

In October 2010, Ubisoft and Aardman announced a partnership to produce a TV series pilot and several shorts based on the franchise. One year later, it was announced that a series of 7-minute computer generated animated episodes called Rabbids Invasion had been commissioned by France Televisions and that it would be produced in-house by Ubisoft Motion Pictures in France. In 2013, The series premiered on France 3 in France and Nickelodeon in the United States. In early 2012, Ubisoft Motion Pictures called on the French animation studio TeamTO to create most of the CGI parts of the series. At E3 2013, it was announced that it would be an interactive show entitled Rabbids Invasion: The Interactive TV Show for the Xbox 360, Xbox One and PlayStation 4 with a require of camera devices (Kinect and PlayStation Camera). The show aired for four seasons, with the fourth season premiering on Netflix on July 1, 2019.

Film 
In early 2014, a live-action/animated film based on the franchise was in the works by Columbia Pictures. The following year, Sony Pictures Animation joined in. It was supposed to aim for a late 2016 release, but reasons are unknown why it did not get released during that time. However, in late 2019, Ubisoft signed a deal with Lionsgate to produce the Rabbids movie instead, with Todd Strauss-Schulson in talks to direct the film with Todd Lieberman and David Hoberman as producers along with Jason Altman and Margaret Boykin. It is being developed by Lionsgate, Ubisoft Motion Pictures, Mandeville Films, and Stoopid Buddy Stoodios, with Matt Senreich, Tom Sheppard, and Zeb Wells set to write the film, while revised by Todd Rosenberg.

Comic book series 
A comic book series based on the franchise has been released in France, Belgium and Switzerland. They are drawn by the French cartoonist Romain Pujol and written by Thithaume. There are ten volumes.

Merchandising 
The Rabbids have merchandising such as T-shirts, figurines, plush toys, school equipment, fan club magazines, and for a limited time, a Happy Meal toy. A Raving Rabbids themed version of the card game Jungle Speed was released in France.

Licensing 
The Rabbids franchise has also been licensed for the out-of-home entertainment market such as the recent collaboration with arcade game manufacturer LAI Games to produce Virtual Rabbids: The Big Ride, an attendant-free VR attraction.

Reception 

The Rabbids series, along with its titular characters, have become very popular. IGN has stated that the Rabbids have "more personality and charisma than 10 of the most popular video game mascots combined", and that the bunnies have literally "upstaged Rayman himself". 

GameSpot noted that the Rabbids themselves are "almost exclusively responsible for [selling the game's humor], as they are, without a doubt, hysterical. They're adorably designed, with their dumb stares, high-pitched shrieks, and a penchant for taking comedic bumps."

References

External links

 
Ubisoft franchises
Video games about rabbits and hares
Video game franchises introduced in 2006
Video game mascots
Video game species and races
Video game spin-offs
Video games adapted into comics
Video games adapted into television shows